Behdasht Rural District is a rural district (dehestan) in the Kushk-e Nar District of Parsian County, Hormozgan Province, Iran. At the 2006 census, its population was 11,557, in 2,449 families.  The rural district has 18 villages.

References 

Rural Districts of Hormozgan Province
Parsian County